Raima Islam Shimu ( – after 16 January 2022) was a Bangladeshi actress, film producer and director. She who has starred in 24 films and numerous TV dramas since 1998. Shimu disappeared on 16 January 2022, and she was later murdered.

Early life and career 

Her first film was Bartaman (1998), directed by Kazi Hayat. Her final film appearance was in Jamai Shashur (2002).

Murder 
Shimu went missing on January 16, 2022. Shimu's husband Sakhawat Ali Nobel was depressed due to various reasons including closure of business. He gradually became suspicious of his wife being unfaithful. This led to marital quarrels, which eventually led to her death by her husband. Shimu reported her husband being abusive to the police sometimes earlier her death. Her husband and his friend planned and executed the murder, and later confessed to the police on January 19. Her dismembered dead body was found by police in Keraniganj Upazila in Dhaka District on 17 January 2022. The body was kept in the morgue of Sir Salimullah Medical College.

Notes

References 

20th-century births
2022 deaths
Bangladeshi actresses
Bangladeshi directors
Bangladeshi film producers
2022 murders in Bangladesh